Dick or Richard Joyce may refer to:
 Dick Joyce (baseball) (1943–2007), pitcher 
 Dick Joyce (rower) (born 1946), former New Zealand rower 
 Richard Joyce (goldsmith) (c. 1660–1737), Irish goldsmith
 Richard Joyce (philosopher) (born 1966), British-Australian moral philosopher
 Richard Joyce (field hockey) (born 1992), New Zealand field hockey player
 Richard Joyce (astronomer) (born 1944), American astronomer

See also 
 Dick Joice (1921–1999), British broadcaster and historian